Patrick Joseph Flaherty (June 29, 1876 – January 23, 1968), born in Mansfield (now Carnegie), Pennsylvania, was a pitcher for the Louisville Colonels (1899), Pittsburgh Pirates (1900 and 1904–05), Chicago White Sox (1903–1904), Boston Doves (1907–08), Philadelphia Phillies (1910) and Boston Rustlers (1911), who specialized in his spitball.

He led the American League in hits allowed (338) and losses (25) in 1903. He led the National League in earned runs allowed (88) in 1908.

In 9 years Flaherty had a win–loss record of 67–84, 173 games, 150 games started, 125 complete games, 7 shutouts, 18 games finished, 2 saves,  innings pitched, 1,292 hits allowed, 616 runs allowed, 449 earned runs allowed, 25 home runs allowed, 331 walks allowed, 271 strikeouts, 56 hit batsmen, 25 wild pitches, 5,156 batters faced, 2 balks and a 3.10 ERA.

He died in Alexandria, Louisiana, at the age of 91.

References

External links

1876 births
1968 deaths
19th-century baseball players
Atlanta Crackers players
Baseball players from Pennsylvania
Boston Doves players
Boston Rustlers players
Chicago Cubs scouts
Chicago White Sox players
Cleveland Indians scouts
Columbus Senators players
Fargo-Moorhead Graingrowers players
Hartford Indians players
Grand Forks Flickertails players
Jackson Wolverines players
Kansas City Blues (baseball) players
Louisville Colonels players
Louisville Colonels (minor league) managers
Louisville Colonels (minor league) players
Major League Baseball pitchers
Paterson Giants players
Paterson Silk Weavers players
Paterson Weavers players
Philadelphia Phillies players
Pittsburgh Pirates players
Richmond Bluebirds players
Syracuse Stars (minor league baseball) players
Toronto Royals players
Waterloo Shamrocks players
Wooden Nutmegs players
Youngstown Puddlers players
People from Carnegie, Pennsylvania